Doreen Elizabeth Massey, Baroness Massey of Darwen (born 5 September 1938), is a Labour member of the House of Lords.

Early life
She was educated at the University of Birmingham (BA, DipEd, vice-pres Student Union, Hockey and Cricket blues), and the University of London (MA).

Career
A former teacher and education advisor, she was the director of the Family Planning Association from 1989 to 1994. She was made a life peer as Baroness Massey of Darwen, of Darwen in the County of Lancashire, on 26 July 1999. She was introduced on 1 November 1999 to the House of Lords where she served as a member of the All-Party Parliamentary Group for Integrated and Complementary Healthcare.

She is an honorary associate of the National Secular Society, and secretary of the All Party Parliamentary Humanist Group.

On 15 September 2010, Massey, along with 54 other public figures, signed an open letter published in The Guardian, stating their opposition to Pope Benedict XVI's state visit to the UK.

On 28 January 2019 Massey was the only person to remove her name from an open letter published in The Guardian opposing the "US attempt at regime change" in Venezuela. The letter was signed by Shadow Ministers, MPs, union leaders, Labour Party NEC members, cultural figures, academics, anti-war campaigners and others.

LGBT rights
In January 2022, Massey and four other Labour delegates to the Parliamentary Assembly of the Council of Europe tabled ten amendments to Resolution 2417, "Combating rising hate against LGBTI people in Europe". The amendments sought to include the word "sex" alongside gender identity, de-conflate the situation in the UK from Hungary, Poland, Russia and Turkey, and remove references to alleged anti-LGBTI movements in the UK. The delegates received both praise and criticism.

References

1938 births
Living people
Massey of Darwen, Doreen Massey, Baroness
British secularists
Alumni of the University of Birmingham
Life peeresses created by Elizabeth II